Kelly DiPucchio (born March 7, 1967) is an American writer of children's books.  DiPucchio was born in Warren, Michigan.  She attended Michigan State University where she graduated in 1989 in child psychology and development. She currently lives in Detroit, Michigan. Her books have made the New York Times bestseller list.

Work 
DiPucchio's first published work, Bed Hogs (2004), is about a piglet who is the runt of the litter and has no room to sleep at night.

The story, Grace for President (2008), was written after an editor's preschool girl asked why there were no women presidents of the United States. The story follows Grace, an African-American girl as she runs in a mock election at her school. Grace for President is a "helpful introduction to the electoral system and empowering story for girls," according to Booklist. The story has had a cultural effect in the U.S., where children have even dressed up as Grace for Halloween. The book was listed on The New York Times Best Seller list in 2008.

DiPucchio was also able to collaborate with Queen Rania Al Abdullah from Jordon in the book, The Sandwich Swap (2010).

Zombie in Love (2011) is a love story about a zombie, named Mortimer, who finally meets the girls of his dreams. Kirkus Reviews wrote that DiPucchio's writing was "loaded with humorous understatement." Zombie in Love has been turned into a stage play written by Michelle Elliot and with music by Danny Larsen.

Crafty Chloe: Dress-Up Mess-Up (2013)provides "insight into the creative process" according to Kirkus Reviews.

Gaston (2014), a story about a bulldog being accidentally raised by poodles in a comic baby-mix-up story brings up the concepts of nature versus nurture and also about difficult concepts such as assimilation and gender. Publishers Weekly called Gaston a blend of sweetness and style.

Two of DiPucchio's stories, were IRA Teachers' Choices Reading List awardees: Grace for President was selected in 2009 and Gaston was selected in 2015. Gaston was also selected as a 2015 Notable Children's Book for younger readers by the Association for Library Service to Children. In 2014, she was awarded the Gwen Frostic Award, granted by the Michigan Reading Association to an illustrator or author from the state who has helped promote literacy.
Crafty Chloe won the  2012 NAPPA Gold Award in the category of Preschoolers & Up.  The Sandwich Swap was approved by the 2010 Parents Choice Award.  This book was co-written by Queen Rania al Abdullah of Jordon and appeared on The New York Times Best Seller list in 2010.

Publications 
Bed Hogs, illustrated by Howard Fine, Hyperion Books for Children (New York, NY), 2004 
Liberty's Journey, illustrated by Richard Egielski, Hyperion Books for Children (New York, NY), 2004 
Dinosnores, illustrated by Ponder Goembel, HarperCollins (New York, NY), 2005 
Mrs. McBloom, Clean Up Your Classroom!, illustrated by Guy Francis, Hyperion Books for Children (New York, NY), 2005 
What's the Magic Word?, illustrated by Marsha Winborn, HarperCollins (New York, NY), 2005 
Grace for President, illustrated by LeUyen Pham, Hyperion Books for Children (New York, NY), 2008 
Sipping Spiders through a Straw: Campfire Songs for Monsters, illustrated by Gris Grimly, Scholastic Press (New York, NY), 2008 
How to Potty Train Your Monster, illustrated by Mike Moon, Disney-Hyperion (New York, NY), 2009 
Alfred Zector, Book Collector, illustrated by Macky Pamintuan, Harper (New York, NY), 2010 
The Sandwich Swap, with Queen Rania al Abdullah, illustrated by Tricia Tusa, Disney-Hyperion Books (New York, NY), 2010 
Clink, illustrated by Matthew Myers, Balzer & Bray (New York, NY), 2011 
Gilbert Goldfish Wants a Pet, illustrated by Bob Shea, Dial Books for Young Readers (New York, NY), 2011 
Zombie in Love, illustrated by Scott Campbell, Atheneum Books for Young Readers (New York, NY), 2011 
Crafty Chloe, illustrated by Heather Ross, Atheneum Books for Young Readers (New York, NY), 2012 
Crafty Chloe: Dress-Up Mess-Up, illustrated by Heather Ross, Atheneum Books for Young Readers (New York, NY), 2013 
Gaston, illustrated by Christian Robinson, 2014 
Zombie in Love 2+1, illustrated by Scott Campbell, 2014 
Dog Days of School, illustrated by Brian Biggs, 2014 
Everyone Loves Bacon, illustrated by Eric Wight, Farrar, Straus, and Giroux books for Young Readers (New York, NY), 2015, 
Dragon Was Terrible, illustrated by Greg Pizzoli, Farrar, Straus, and Giroux books for Young Readers (New York, NY), 2016, 
Everyone Loves Cupcake, illustrated by Eric Wight, Farrar, Straus, and Giroux books for Young Readers (New York, NY), 2016, 
One Little Two Little Three Little Children, illustrated by Mary Lundquist, Balzer + Bray, 2016, 
Antoinette, illustrated by Christian Robinson, Atheneum Books for Young Readers (New York, NY), 2017, 
Super Manny Stands Up!, illustrated by Stephanie Graegin, Atheneum Books for Young Readers (New York, NY), 2017, 
Littles: And How They Grow, illustrated by A.G. Ford, Doubleday Books for Young Readers, 2017, 
Poe Won't Go, illustrated by Zachariah OHora, Disney-Hyperion (New York, NY), 2018 
How to Grow Happiness: A Jerome the Gnome Adventure, illustrated by Matt Kaufenberg, Rodale Kids, 2018, 
We're Going on a Treasure Hunt, illustrated by Jay Fleck, Farrar, Straus, and Giroux books for Young Readers (New York, NY), 2019, 
Grace Goes to Washington, illustrated by LeUyen Pham, Disney-Hyperion (New York, NY), 2019,

References

External links 

 Kelly DiPucchio Blog
 Author's website

1967 births
Living people
American children's writers
21st-century American writers
21st-century American women writers
People from Warren, Michigan
Michigan State University alumni